Overbrook High School may refer to:

Overbrook High School (Philadelphia)
Overbrook High School (New Jersey) in Pine Hill, New Jersey